Events from the year 1849 in Denmark.

Incumbents
 Monarch – Frederick VII
 Prime minister – Adam Wilhelm Moltke

Events

 12 January – General conscription is introduced in Denmark a few weeks after the First Schleswig War has been resumed after a winter break.
 3 February – The Danish Veterinary Association is founded.
 5 June – The Constitution of Denmark is signed by King Frederik VII.

First Schleswig War 
 5 April – Battle of Eckernförde
 12 April – Battle of Kolding
 31 May – Skirmish of Århus
 4 June – Battle of Heligoland
 6 July – Battle of Fredericia

Date unknown
 The requirement for passports for journeys inside Denmark is abolished.
 The Danish West Indian daler replaces the rigsdaler as the currency of the Danish West Indies.

Births
 16 January – Hans Ole Brasen, painter (died 1930)
 19 February – Ida Falbe-Hansen, educator and women's activist (died 1922)
 27 March – Albert Schou, photographer (died 1900)
 26 April – Olaf Poulsen, comedic stage actor (died 1923)
 9 June – Michael Ancher, painter (died 1927)
 5 July – Anthonore Christensen, painter (died 1926)
 19 July – Louise Ravn-Hansen, painter (died 1909 in Germany)
 21 July – Leopold Rosenfeld, composer (died 1909)
 24 July – J. A. D. Jensen, naval officer and Arctic explorer (died 1936)
 3 August – Axel Liebmann, composer (died 1876)
 6 August – Gustav Frederik Holm, naval officer and Arctic explorer (died 1940)
 14 August – Aksel Mikkelsen, educator (died 1929)
 15 August – Frida Schmidt, suffragist (died 1934)
 16 August – Johan Kjeldahl, chemist (died 1900)
 27 September – Nanna Liebmann, composer and music critic (died 1935)
 27 October – Søren Anton van der Aa Kühle, brewer and businessman (died 1906)
 5 November – Emil Blichfeldt, architect (died 1908)
 11 November – Martin Nyrop, architect (died 1921)

Deaths

 3 May – Catharine Simonsen, soprano (born 1816)
 27 May – Frederik Michael Ernst Fabritius de Tengnagel, military officer and landscape painter (born 1781)
 19 July – Christian Tuxen Falbe, naval officer and explorer (born 1791)
 15 August – Christopher Friedenreich Hage, merchant (born 1759)
 4 December – Georg Frederik Ursin, mathematician and astronomer (born 1797)

References

 
1840s in Denmark
Denmark
Years of the 19th century in Denmark